The Royal Ulster Yacht Club is located in Bangor, County Down, Northern Ireland, on the south shore of Belfast Lough.

History
The club was established in 1866 as the Ulster Yacht Club, on the impetus of Frederick Hamilton-Temple-Blackwood, 1st Marquess of Dufferin and Ava. In 1869 it received a royal warrant.  The land for the clubhouse was purchased in 1897 and built by architect Vincent Craig (brother of the 1st Lord Craigavon).

The boating grocer, Sir Thomas Lipton, being blackballed from the Royal Yacht Squadron, launched his America's Cup bid from the RUYC in 1898.  Lipton continued to sail from the Royal Ulster until 1929; his legacy being the Lipton Room.

Today the club's patron is Queen Elizabeth II (a position she has held since 1953) and the commodore is Prince Richard, Duke of Gloucester.

RUYC was visited by the Queen and the Duke of Edinburgh in 1961, with the Duke competing in the Regatta. The duke returned to the club in 2006.

The club is one of the clubs on the lough that form part of the Belfast Lough Yachting Conference.

External links
 Royal Ulster Yacht Club

References

Royal yacht clubs
Yacht clubs in Northern Ireland
America's Cup yacht clubs
Sports clubs in County Down
Bangor, County Down
1866 establishments in Ireland
Sports clubs established in 1866
Organisations based in Northern Ireland with royal patronage
Organisations based in the United Kingdom with royal patronage
Grade B1 listed buildings